Madison Township is one of thirteen townships in Putnam County, Indiana. As of the 2010 census, its population was 1,028 and it contained 467 housing units.

Geography

Unincorporated towns
 Brunerstown at 
 Keytsville at 
 Vivalia at 
(This list is based on USGS data and may include former settlements.)

References

External links
 Indiana Township Association
 United Township Association of Indiana

Townships in Putnam County, Indiana
Townships in Indiana